Harald Keres (in Pärnu – 26 June 2010) was an Estonian physicist considered to be the father of the Estonian school of relativistic gravitation theory. In 1961 Keres became a member of the Estonian Academy of Sciences in the field of theoretical physics. In 1996 Keres was awarded  the Order of the National Coat of Arms, Class III.

Keres was the elder brother of chess grandmaster Paul Keres.

References

External links
Harald Keres  at the Estonian Academy of Sciences
Tartu Observatory about Harald Keres

1912 births
2010 deaths
People from Pärnu
People from the Governorate of Livonia
20th-century Estonian physicists
University of Tartu alumni
Academic staff of the University of Tartu
Members of the Estonian Academy of Sciences
Recipients of the Order of the National Coat of Arms, 3rd Class
Burials at Raadi cemetery
Soviet physicists